New Space is a social democratic party in Uruguay.

History 
The party was founded in 1994 by Senator Rafael Michelini. It was born as a split of the centrist Party for the Government of the People (Partido por el Gobierno del Pueblo, PGB), whose leader was the former Vice-President Hugo Batalla, when the party decided to join the traditional liberal Colorado Party for the 1994 Uruguayan general election. "New Space" had originally been the name of an electoral alliance formed after the more centrist elements of the Broad Front had left the centre-left alliance, which they deemed too strongly dominated by the Marxist elements, in 1989 and included notably the PGB and the Christian Democratic Party (PDCU).

While the PDCU returned to the Broad Front in 1994, the New Space party ran separately, as the fourth force behind the two traditional ruling parties and the Broad Front. It obtained five seats in the Chamber of Deputies and one Senator. In 1999, the party was returned four deputies and its Senator. Michelini who ran as the party's presidential candidate won 4.4% of the vote. The party positioned itself in the political center and won most of its supporters among the lower-middle and lower classes.

In 2001, the New Space decided to re-join the Broad Front for the 2004 campaign. As a result, there was a new crack in the party's board. The Independent Party emerged, led by Deputy Pablo Mieres. The New Space has supported the governments of Presidents Tabaré Vázquez (2005–2010, 2015–2020) and José Mujica (2010–2015). In 2009, the New Space, alongside Uruguay Assembly and Progressive Alliance, founded the Liber Seregni Front as a moderate social democratic sub-group within the Broad Front.

The New Space party has been a member of the Socialist International since shortly after its foundation.

Electoral history

Presidential elections 
Due to its membership in the Broad Front, the party has endorsed the candidates of other parties on several occasions. Presidential elections in Uruguay are held using a two-round system, the results of which are displayed below.

References

External links 
 Official web site

1994 establishments in Uruguay
Broad Front (Uruguay)
Full member parties of the Socialist International
Political parties established in 1994
Political parties in Uruguay
Political party factions in Uruguay
Social democratic parties in Uruguay